Matthew L. Fraser is an American psychic medium who features in the reality TV show Meet the Frasers. Fraser was the medium unsuccessfully targeted in the sting known as Operation Peach Pit reported on in The New York Times in 2019. Critics who have studied Fraser’s performances claim that he uses classic cold reading techniques to convince his audience that he possesses paranormal powers.

Career 
Prior to becoming a professional psychic, Fraser trained as a paramedic and physician assistant. He has said that, when working as an Emergency Medical Technician, he realized he had an ability to help people emotionally, and that he once did psychic readings while working at an East Providence, Rhode Island beauty salon.

Fraser says  he "inherited his gift to hear 'messages from heaven' from his grandmother and his mother." According to the South Florida Gay News, Fraser claims his first contact with the dead was with the spirit of his grandmother.  He has also said that his native American heritage is important to his psychic abilities.

In 2012, Fraser published a book, The Secrets to Unlocking Your Psychic Ability. His second book, When Heaven Calls, is due to be released in 2020. 

Fraser claims that he has worked with local police and private investigators on cold cases, in which he helped families locate their missing children.

Fraser and Papigiotis live in Cranston, Rhode Island. Fraser's mother, who also claims to be a psychic, is his office manager.

Meet the Frasers
Fraser stars in a reality TV show, Meet the Frasers, on E! beginning in January 2020. The series focuses on Fraser and his family, including his fiance Alexa Papigiotis, his mother and his sister Maria Fraser, who said in a promo that "I don't believe in psychics... But, I support my brother and I respect what he does, 'cause he's making money." A second season was planned, but has been delayed due to the COVID-19 pandemic.

Critical analysis

Live shows 

Critics and the media have attended Fraser's live shows, and reported on the cold reading techniques being used:
Paranormal investigator Kenny Biddle wrote: "I watched Fraser ask entire rows of people to stand up at a time then commence throwing out general statements (e.g., I'm seeing a father figure that passed) and waiting for someone in the row to claim it was their relative ... he was actually giving himself a one in twelve chance that someone will be hooked." Biddle also noted that Fraser may playfully scold an audience member if they were not forthcoming with the psychic connection required to continue his routine.
 Skeptic Susan Gerbic wrote: "The wordplay used by a medium who is cold reading is only something you can understand if you slow it down and replay it. The statements made are usually so general that they would fit most people of a given generation. But the performer adds enough dialog to make it sound really personal and specific to the sitter."
The New York Times reported: "Fraser was a brilliant performer... It was a classic cold reading, all generalized notions searching for something slightly more specific to move [on] to."
Mentalist Mark Edward observed that: "[Fraser] goes to one end and stands just slightly in front of the row, leaning forward so he can see all their faces and body language. He states a standard fishing line such as he's 'getting an impression' of something... he brings up into view his pointing index finger and begins the process of generally pointing it at the row... scanning for a reaction."

Operation Peach Pit 

The New York Times reporter Jack Hitt was embedded with a team of skeptics to observe what was called "Operation Peach Pit", a sting following a procedure similar to one previously used against Thomas John. In this case, the target was Fraser. According to Hitt, Fraser "resembles Tom Cruise in the role of an oversharing altar boy. He has been on the circuit for years, has a book under his belt and works some Doubletree or Crowne Plaza back room every two or three days". Kenny Biddle and a group of five friends, using aliases matching the faked Facebook accounts, attended Fraser's show at the Valley Forge Casino in King of Prussia for the sting. As Biddle reported in Skeptical Inquirer, none of the team members were selected for a reading.

Works and publications

References

External links

American television personalities
Male television personalities
American spiritual mediums
American spiritual writers
American psychics
People from Cranston, Rhode Island
Living people
American people of Italian descent
1991 births